Thomas J. "Tom" McGarrigle (born ) is a Pennsylvania politician. A Republican, he was the Pennsylvania State Senator for the 26th district until 2018. Prior to being elected to the State Senate in the 2014 election, McGarrigle served as chairman of the Delaware County Council. McGarrigle lost his 2018 reelection bid to Democrat Tim Kearney, then mayor of Swarthmore, Pennsylvania. In 2019 he was chosen to lead the Delaware County Republican Party.

References

External links
Tom McGarrigle for State Senate campaign website

Living people
People from Springfield Township, Delaware County, Pennsylvania
1950s births
Republican Party Pennsylvania state senators
21st-century American politicians